= Computerbandit =

- Birth name: Christian Rolf
- Born: 1983; Hanau, West Germany (now Germany)
- Genres: Synthwave, Synth-pop
- Occupation(s): Songwriter; Record producer
- Years active: 2019-present
- Website: computerbanditmusic.com

Computerbandit (born 1983 in Hanau; real name Christian Rolf) is a German musician and music producer in the genre of electronic music.

== About ==
Christian Rolf has been active as a music producer with the alias Computerbandit since 2019. His musical output ranges between the genres of 80's-inspired synthwave, electronica, electro, electroclash, and synthpop. His productions are influenced by the sound of the 80s.

He gained international attention in 2021 with his fourth release and the music track "You Are Digital", which went viral on his Instagram account. In the same year, his production "You Are Digital" was awarded by "Magnetic Magazine" as one of the best music productions of the month in the category, Synthesizer Tracks. This was followed by further contributions in blogs and magazines in Germany, the US, the Netherlands, and Belgium. His other releases received positive reviews as well certifying a "marvelous escapist quality" or "skillful mixture of synthwave and electroclash".

In addition to his own releases, Computerbandit also produces music for synchronization in the field of advertising productions for the ASUS brand, among others.

== Trivia ==
During an interview, Combuterbandit revealed that the cover artwork of "You Are Digital" has been created by The Real Theory, artist, founder & CEO of artgrab.co.

In June 2021, Rolf has been featured by the Big Shot magazine asking Computerbandit to reveal his personal June 2021 chart showing the French DJ Commuter at the top.

== Discography ==
=== Albums ===
- Till Tex (2020)
- By Your Side (2020)
- You Are Digital (2021)

=== Singles ===
- Are You Tired (2020)
- Popper, Punks & Porsche Drivers (2021)
- Lose Control (2022)
